NK Koprivnica is a Croatian football club based in the town of Koprivnica. The team shares a stadium with top-flight team NK Slaven Belupo. From  the season  2007–08  they are playing  continuously in the Treća HNL.

Honours 

 Treća HNL – North:
Winners (1): 1999–00

External links 

Association football clubs established in 1950
Football clubs in Croatia
Football clubs in Koprivnica-Križevci County
1950 establishments in Croatia
Koprivnica